The 2019 election to the Derry City and Strabane District Council, part of the Northern Ireland local elections on 2 May 2019, returned 40 members to the council via Single Transferable Vote.

Election results

Note: "Votes" are the first preference votes.

The overall turnout was 56.21% with a total of 60,695 valid votes cast. A total of 1,103 ballots were rejected.

Districts summary

|- class="unsortable" align="centre"
!rowspan=2 align="left"|Ward
! % 
!Cllrs
! %
!Cllrs
! %
!Cllrs
! %
!Cllrs
! %
!Cllrs
! % 
!Cllrs
! % 
!Cllrs
!rowspan=2|TotalCllrs
|- class="unsortable" align="center"
!colspan=2 bgcolor="" | Sinn Féin
!colspan=2 bgcolor=""| SDLP
!colspan=2 bgcolor="" | DUP
!colspan=2 bgcolor="" | UUP
!colspan=2 bgcolor="" | PBP
!colspan=2 bgcolor="" | Alliance
!colspan=2 bgcolor="white"| Others
|-
|align="left"|Ballyarnett
|30.7
|2
|bgcolor="#99FF66"|39.7
|bgcolor="#99FF66"|3
|0.0
|0
|0.0
|0
|8.6
|0
|3.6
|0
|17.5
|1
|6
|-
|align="left"|Derg
|bgcolor="#008800"|37.0
|bgcolor="#008800"|2
|12.9
|1
|23.3
|1
|15.8
|1
|0.0
|0
|1.9
|0
|9.2
|0
|6
|-
|align="left"|Faughan
|16.5
|1
|24.5
|1
|bgcolor="#D46A4C"|27.9
|bgcolor="#D46A4C"|2
|9.9
|0
|0.0
|0
|11.0
|1
|10.3
|0
|5
|-
|align="left"|Foyleside
|29.5
|1
|bgcolor="#99FF66"|41.9
|bgcolor="#99FF66"|2
|0.0
|0
|0.0
|0
|11.3
|1
|4.1
|0
|11.2
|1
|5
|-
|align="left"|Sperrin
|bgcolor="#008800"|31.0
|bgcolor="#008800"|2
|14.9
|1
|18.8
|2
|5.1
|0
|0.0
|0
|4.0
|0
|26.1
|2
|7
|-
|align="left"|The Moor
|bgcolor="#008800"|36.4
|bgcolor="#008800"|2
|22.6
|1
|1.9
|0
|0.0
|0
|13.4
|1
|1.6
|0
|24.1
|1
|5
|-
|align="left"|Waterside
|16.2
|1
|24.3
|2
|bgcolor="#D46A4C"|28.8
|bgcolor="#D46A4C"|2
|16.0
|1
|7.6
|0
|7.2
|1
|0.0
|0
|7
|-
|- class="unsortable" class="sortbottom" style="background:#C9C9C9"
|align="left"| Total
|28.1
|11
|25.5
|11
|14.7
|7
|6.8
|2
|5.9
|2
|4.7
|2
|14.3
|5
|40
|-
|}

District results

Ballyarnett

2014: 3 x Sinn Féin, 2 x SDLP, 1 x Independent
2019: 3 x SDLP, 2 x Sinn Féin, 1 x Aontú
2014-2019 Change: SDLP and Aontú gain from Sinn Féin and Independent

Derg

2014: 3 x Sinn Féin, 1 x DUP, 1 x UUP
2019: 2 x Sinn Féin, 1 x DUP, 1 x UUP, 1 x SDLP
2014-2019 Change: SDLP gain from Sinn Féin

Faughan

2014: 2 x DUP, 2 x SDLP, 1 x Sinn Féin 
2019: 2 x DUP, 1 x SDLP, 1 x Sinn Féin, 1 x Alliance
2014-2019 Change: Alliance gain from SDLP

Foyleside

2014: 2 x SDLP, 2 x Sinn Féin, 1 x Independent
2019: 2 x SDLP, 1 x Sinn Féin, 1 x People Before Profit, 1 x Independent
2014-2019 Change: People Before Profit gain from Sinn Féin

Sperrin

2014: 3 x Sinn Féin, 2 x DUP, 1 x SDLP, 1 x Independent
2019: 2 x Sinn Féin, 2 x DUP, 2 x Independent, 1 x SDLP
2014-2019 Change: Independent gain from Sinn Féin

The Moor

2014: 3 x Sinn Féin, 1 x SDLP, 1 x Independent
2019: 2 x Sinn Féin, 1 x SDLP, 1 x People Before Profit, 1 x Independent
2014-2019 Change: People Before Profit gain from Sinn Féin

Waterside

2014: 3 x DUP, 2 x SDLP, 1 x Sinn Féin, 1 x UUP
2019: 2 x DUP, 2 x SDLP, 1 x Sinn Féin, 1 x UUP, 1 x Alliance
2014-2019 Change: Alliance gain from DUP

Changes during the term

† Co-options

‡ Changes in affiliation

– Suspensions
Derek Hussey (UUP) was suspended from the council for fifteen months from 16 July 2019. During his suspension he resigned from council and was replaced by Andy McKane who resigned at the end of the fifteen months for Hussey to return.

Last updated 20 December 2022.

Current composition: see Derry City and Strabane District Council

Notes

References

2019 Northern Ireland local elections
21st century in Derry (city)
21st century in County Tyrone
Elections in Derry (city)
Elections in County Londonderry
Elections in County Tyrone